Varsity Blues is a 1999 American coming-of-age sports comedy-drama film directed by Brian Robbins that follows a small-town high school football team through a tumultuous season, in which the players must deal with the pressures of adolescence and their football-obsessed community while having their overbearing coach constantly on their back. In the small fictional town of West Canaan, Texas, football is a way of life and losing is not an option. The film drew a domestic box office gross of $52 million against its estimated $16 million budget despite mixed critical reviews. The film has since gone on to become a cult film.

Plot
In the small town of West Canaan, Texas, Jonathan “Mox” Moxon is an academically gifted backup quarterback for the high school Varsity football team, the West Canaan Coyotes. Despite his relative popularity at school, easy friendships with other players, and smart and sassy girlfriend Jules Harbor, Mox is dissatisfied with his life. Wanting to leave Texas and attend Brown University, he constantly clashes with his football-obsessed father Sam, and dreads playing under legendary coach Bud Kilmer, a verbally abusive, controlling authority who believes in winning no matter what it takes, and has a strong track record, remarking in a speech, "In my thirty years of coaching at West Canaan, I have brought two state titles, and 22 district championships!"

Kilmer's philosophy finally takes its toll when he pushes the Coyotes' star quarterback Lance Harbor, Mox's best friend and Jules' older brother, into taking painkilling shots into an injured knee. This leads to Lance injuring the knee further during a game, partly because Kilmer had forced offensive lineman Billy Bob to continue playing despite a concussion. At the hospital, the doctors, appalled at the massive amount of scar tissue found under his knee, explain that recovery will take at least a year and a half, costing Lance his football scholarship to Florida State.

Mox, who has accompanied Lance, is shocked when Kilmer denies his role in Lance's injury, when in fact he ordered the trainer to provide the painkillers. Needing a new quarterback, Kilmer reluctantly names Mox to replace Lance as team captain and starting quarterback, which brings unexpected dividends for Mox. Wanting to marry someone leaving West Canaan in order to escape small-town life, Darcy Sears, Lance's cheerleader girlfriend, shows sexual interest in Mox and even attempts to seduce him with a whipped cream "bikini" over her otherwise naked body, but he gently rebuffs her, telling her that she can independently escape West Canaan. 

Disgusted with Kilmer and not strongly needing to win, Mox starts calling his own plays on the field without Kilmer's approval. He also chides his father, screaming at him, "I don't want your life!" Sam had been a football player at West Canaan, and although Kilmer dismissed him for lacking talent and courage, Sam still respected and obeyed him. When Kilmer discovers that Mox has won a full academic scholarship to Brown, he threatens to alter Mox's transcripts to endanger his scholarship unless he falls in line.

Kilmer's disregard for players continues, resulting in Billy Bob's dramatic mental collapse. When star running back Wendell Brown, another friend of Mox's, is injured in the district title game, Kilmer persuades him to take a shot of cortisone to deaden the pain in his knee, allowing Wendell to continue at risk of more serious, and perhaps even permanent, injury. Desperate to be recruited by a good college, Wendell almost consents when Mox intervenes and tells Kilmer he will quit if the procedure continues. Undaunted, Kilmer orders wide receiver Charlie Tweeder, a friend of both Mox and Wendell, to replace Mox, but Tweeder refuses. Mox tells Kilmer that the team will only return to the field without him.

Realizing that he will be forced to forfeit the game, an angered Kilmer physically assaults Mox, but the other players intercede and then refuse to take to the field. Knowing his outburst has cost him his credibility, Kilmer tries unsuccessfully to rally support and spark the team's spirit into trusting him, but none of the players follow him out of the locker room. Kilmer continues down the hall, and seeing no one following him, then turns in the other direction and into his office. Using a five-receiver offense in the second half, the Coyotes proceed to win the game and the district championship without Kilmer's guidance, thanks largely to Lance calling the plays from the sideline, and Billy Bob scoring the game-winning touchdown on a hook-and-ladder play.

In a voice-over epilogue, Mox recounts several characters' aftermaths: Kilmer left town and never coached again, but his statue still remained due to its weight; after the game, Tweeder drank beer and Billy Bob cried in celebration; Lance became a successful football coach, Wendell received a football scholarship to Grambling State University, and Mox went on to attend Brown on an academic scholarship.

Cast
 James Van Der Beek as Jonathan "Mox" Moxon, an academically successful, yet rebellious backup quarterback.
 Jon Voight as Coach Bud Kilmer, the Coyotes' tyrannical 30-year head coach.
 Paul Walker as Lance Harbor, the original captain and starting quarterback of the Coyotes and Mox's best friend.
 Amy Smart as Julie "Jules" Harbor, Mox's girlfriend and Lance's younger sister.
 Ron Lester as Billy Bob, an overweight but powerful offensive guard. 
 Scott Caan as Charlie Tweeder, a wild, cocky and hard-partying wide receiver.
 Eliel Swinton as Wendell Brown, the star running back and one of only three African American players on the Coyotes.
 Ali Larter as Darcy Sears, Lance's girlfriend, captain of the cheerleading squad.
 Thomas F. Duffy as Sam Moxon, Mox's football-obsessed father.
 Richard Lineback as Joe Harbor, Lance and Jules’ father.
 Jill Parker Jones as Mo Moxon, Mox's mother.
 Tiffany C. Love as Collette Harbor, Lance and Jules’ mother.
 Joe Pichler as Kyle Moxon, Mox's younger brother who is into religions rather than football.
 Jesse Plemons as Tommy Harbor, Lance and Julie's younger brother and Kyle's best friend.
 Tonie Perensky as Miss Davis, the Health teacher at West Canaan High School who moonlights as a stripper at the local strip club The Landing Strip.

Reception
The film opened at #1 at the North American box office making $17.5 million USD in its opening weekend. Though it had a 39.6% decline in earnings, it was still enough to keep it at the top spot for another week.

On Rotten Tomatoes, the film has a 43% approval rating based on reviews from 56 critics, with an average rating of 5.2/10. The site's consensus states, "This is a predictable football movie that lacks intensity." On Metacritic, it has a score of 50 out of 100 based on reviews from 20 critics, indicating "mixed or average reviews". Audiences polled by CinemaScore gave the film an average rating of "B+" on an A+ to F scale.

Roger Ebert noted in his Chicago Sun-Times review that, "Scenes work, but they don't pile up and build momentum." ReelViews online film critic James Berardinelli's summary was that although it "takes a worthwhile detour or two, it ultimately finds its way back to the well-worn track of its genre."

The film was later parodied in the 2001 film Not Another Teen Movie; Ron Lester reprised his role of Billy Bob by playing a nearly identical character named Reggie Ray while Ali Larter's whipped cream bikini was parodied. The film was also quoted in the 2004 film Mean Girls as being Regina George's favorite movie.

On January 21, 2002, Nelvana and MTV announced that they would co-produce a television series based on the film. Screenwriter Peter Iliff and producer Tova Leiter signed on to produce the series. The cast included Sean Dwyer as Stick and Charlie Talbert as Billy-Bob.

Soundtrack
Being a production of MTV Films, the "Varsity Blues" soundtrack included well-known bands as well as little-known songs. The soundtrack album was published by Hollywood Records and contained:
 Two Faces - Days of the New
 Walkin' The Line - by Shawn Camp
 My Girlfriend is a Waitress - by The Iguanas
 Nice Guys Finish Last - by Green Day
 Problems - by the Flamin' Hellcats
 Unnoticed - by Athenaeum
 Love-a-Rama - by Southern Culture on the Skids
 Texas Flood - by Stevie Ray Vaughan
 One Foot in Front of the Other - by Lee Roy Parnell
 Disappear - by Saffron Henderson
 Are You Ready for the Fallout? - by Fastball
 Wayward Wind - by Tex Ritter
 Pride of San Jacinto - by The Reverend Horton Heat
 Run - by Collective Soul
 You Blew Me Off - by Bare, Jr.
 Valley of the Pharaohs - by The Hellecasters
 Lonesome Ain't the Word - by Shawn Camp
 Same Old Feeling - by Tim Buppert
 If Your Girl Only Knew - by Aaliyah
 Boom Boom Boom - by The Iguanas
 Horror Show - by Third Eye Blind
 Hot for Teacher - by Van Halen
 Thunderstruck - by AC/DC
 Voices Inside My Head - by Amber Sunshower
 My Hero by Foo Fighters
 Every Little Thing Counts - by Janus Stark
 Fly - by Loudmouth
 Nitro (Youth Energy) - by Offspring
 Teen Competition - by Redd Kross
 Varsity Blue - by Caroline's Spine

Awards
 1999 Teen Choice Awards
 Choice Movie Breakout: James Van Der Beek (won)
 Choice Drama Movie (nominated)
 1999 MTV Movie Awards
 Best Breakout Performance: James Van Der Beek (won)
 Best Movie Song (nominated)
 2000 Blockbuster Entertainment Awards
 Best Male Newcomer: James Van Der Beek (nominated)

References

External links

 
 
 

1999 films
1999 comedy-drama films
1990s coming-of-age comedy-drama films
1990s high school films
1990s sports comedy-drama films
1990s teen comedy-drama films
American coming-of-age comedy-drama films
American sports comedy-drama films
American teen comedy-drama films
1990s English-language films
Films directed by Brian Robbins
Films scored by Mark Isham
Films set in Texas
Films shot in Texas
High school football films
MTV Films films
Paramount Pictures films
1990s American films